Richard Ritter von Schubert-Soldern (14 December 1852, Prague, Kingdom of Bohemia – 19 October 1924, Zwettl, Austria) was a Bohemian-born Austrian philosopher. (His year of death is sometimes said to have been 1935.)

Schubert-Soldern earned a doctorate at the University of Prague in 1879 and habilitated at Leipzig  University in 1882 with a thesis titled Ueber Trancendenz des Objects und Subjects (On the Transcendence of the Object and Subjec).

He held teaching posts at Leipzig  University and a Görz gymnasium. He defended immanent philosophy and epistemological solipsism.

Works
 Über Transzendenz des Objekts und des Subjekts, 1882
 Grundlagen einer Erkenntnistheorie, 1884
 Grundlagen zu einer Ethik, 1887
 Reproduction, Gefühl und Wille, 1887
 Das menschliche Glück und die soziale Frage, 1896
  Die soziale Deutung der ästhetischen Bildung, 1897
 Die menschliche Erziehung, 1905.

Notes

External links
 'Richard von Schubert-Soldern (1852 - 1935)' at http://www.philosophenlexicon.de
 

1852 births
1924 deaths
Austrian philosophers
Writers from Prague
Austrian male writers
Academic staff of Leipzig University